Carl Gustaf Moritz Thure Lewenhaupt (7 January 1884 – 11 May 1935) was a Swedish horse rider  who competed in the 1920 and 1924 Summer Olympics. In 1920 he won a bronze medal in the individual jumping event. In 1924 he was a non-scoring member of the Swedish team that won a silver medal in team three-day eventing; he failed to finish his individual routine.

Lewenhaupt came from a noble family and was the son of Count Carl-Johan Lewenhaupt. In 1904 he became second lieutenant in a King's dragoons regiment, and was promoted to lieutenant in 1906. After completing his studies at the National Defence College in 1909-11 and at the French Riding School in Saumur he briefly served in the Belgian army in 1913, though his main appointment was with the General Staff, where he served in 1912-14 and 1916–22, reaching the rank of captain in 1917. After that he headed the Swedish railway police and co-founded the Brunkeberg Club, a Swedish nationalist political association.

In parallel to his military activities Lewenhaupt acted as a sport functionary, being the secretary of a jockey club. As a member of the Swedish Olympic Committee he represented Sweden at the Olympic Congresses in Lausanne and Paris.

References

1884 births
1935 deaths
Swedish male equestrians
Swedish nobility
Equestrians at the 1920 Summer Olympics
Equestrians at the 1924 Summer Olympics
Olympic equestrians of Sweden
Olympic silver medalists for Sweden
Olympic bronze medalists for Sweden
Olympic medalists in equestrian
Sportspeople from Örebro
Swedish Army officers
Medalists at the 1920 Summer Olympics